Andriy Hrihorovych Horak (March 1, 1946 - July 5, 2010) was an Eastern Orthodox bishop.

Horak was the Metropolitan bishop of Lviv and Sokol, Ukraine, in Ukrainian Orthodox Church of the Kyivan Patriarchate from 1993 until his death.

Notes

2010 deaths
Bishops of the Ukrainian Orthodox Church of the Kyivan Patriarchate
1946 births
Recipients of the Order of Danylo Halytsky
Burials at Yaniv Cemetery